A Short History of Medicine is a book by Charles Singer, published in 1928 by Oxford University Press.

References

1928 non-fiction books
History books about medicine
Medical books
History of medicine
British non-fiction books